Senator Forsythe may refer to:

Edwin B. Forsythe (1916–1984), New Jersey State Senate
Jim Forsythe (born 1968), New Hampshire State Senate

See also
John Forsyth (politician) (1780–1841), U.S. Senator from Georgia from 1829 to 1834